Martin Devergie (born 26 June 1995) is a French rugby union player playing at the 3rd line center position in the Montpellier Hérault Rugby squad. He is the son of former international rugby player Thierry Devergie, who played at RC Nîmes and FC Grenoble.

Biography 
After having made some meetings with the MHR during the 2015-2016 season, Martin Devergie was loaned for the 2016-2017 season in Colomiers, a Pro D2 club. In March 2017, he signed a 3-year contract with the Montpellier Hérault Rugby.

In November 2017, he was selected with the French Barbarians to face the Maori All Blacks at the Stade Chaban-Delmas in Bordeaux; the Baa-Baas won 19 to 15.

National Team Statistics 
 Selections with the France Under 20 team
 Selections with the France Under-19 team
 Selections with the France Under-18 team

References 

1995 births
Living people
French rugby union players
Montpellier Hérault Rugby players